

The Midwestern Conference Men's Basketball Player of the Year was an annual basketball award given to the Midwestern Conference's most outstanding player. The award was bestowed for just the 1971–72 season, however. When the Midwestern Conference was founded in 1970–71, men's basketball did not name a league player of the year. In the second season of the conference's existence, Northern Illinois' Jim Bradley won the inaugural award. The conference disbanded after that year due to only having five members, and in order to be recognized by the NCAA, a conference was required to have six or more member institutions.

Winners

Winners by school

References

NCAA Division I men's basketball conference players of the year
Player
Awards established in 1972
Awards disestablished in 1972